The People's Liberation Front can refer to several political groups:

People's Liberation Front (Yugoslavia), the World War II Yugoslav coalition of political parties.
People's Liberation Front (Sri Lanka), a Sri Lankan Marxist political party and a former militant organization
Eelam People's Revolutionary Liberation Front, a Sri Lankan political party formed as a militant group.
 Eritrean People's Liberation Front (EPLF), an armed organization that fought for the independence of Eritrea from Ethiopia
Tigray People's Liberation Front (TPLF), a political party in Ethiopia that is the main part of the Ethiopian People's Revolutionary Democratic Front
Khmer People's National Liberation Front (KPNLF), a political front organized in 1979 in opposition to the Vietnamese-installed People's Republic of Kampuchea (PRK) regime in Cambodia 
Namibia People's Liberation Front, an alliance of moderate political parties in Namibia
North Korean People's Liberation Front, a group based in South Korea
People's Liberation Front (Poland), a Polish anarchist militant group
Revolutionary People's Liberation Party/Front, Turkish militant organization

See also
People's Front (disambiguation)
Popular Front
The Popular Front (disambiguation)